Charles Mahlalela (born 18 January 1962) is a Swazi boxer. He competed in the men's light middleweight event at the 1988 Summer Olympics.

References

External links
 

1962 births
Living people
Swazi male boxers
Olympic boxers of Eswatini
Boxers at the 1988 Summer Olympics
Place of birth missing (living people)
Light-middleweight boxers